Edgar Martins de Oliveira (born 11 November 1967 in Ibititá) is a retired Brazilian middle-distance runner who specialised in the 1500 metres. He represented his country at the 1992 Summer Olympics and the 1996 Summer Olympics as well as three  consecutive World Championships, starting in 1991.

Competition record

Personal bests
Outdoor Track
800 metres - 1:46.55 (Americana/SP 1996)
1000 metres - 2:18.80 [Hamburgo 1997]
1500 metres – 3:34.80 (Roma 1991)
One mile – 3:53.30 (Eugene 1998)
3000 metres – 7:52.51 (San Diego 1995)
5000 metres – 13:38.52 (Los Angeles 1995)
Road Race
10km - 29:03 (Chula Vista 1998)
Indoor Track
1500 metres – 3:44.32 (Toronto 1993)

References

1967 births
Living people
Brazilian male middle-distance runners
Athletes (track and field) at the 1992 Summer Olympics
Athletes (track and field) at the 1996 Summer Olympics
Olympic athletes of Brazil
Sportspeople from Bahia
Athletes (track and field) at the 1995 Pan American Games
Pan American Games athletes for Brazil
20th-century Brazilian people
21st-century Brazilian people